Rori Harmon is an American college basketball player for the Texas Longhorns of the Big 12 Conference.

Early life and high school career
Rori Harmon was born and raised in Houston, Texas. Harmon attended Cypress Creek High School where she played basketball and earned many accolades throughout her high school career. These highlights include McDonald's All-American in 2021, 2021 Houston Chronicle All-Greater Houston Girls Basketball Co-Player of the Year, and a Four-time Texas Association of Basketball Coaches all-state selection. At Cypress Creek High School, Harmon scored 2,572 points and had 745 assists with 700 steals in 146 games. Harmon's success on the basketball court gained lots of attention from national recruiting outlets. ESPN gave her a 5 star rating and a 97 overall rating. Furthermore, ESPN also named Harmon the 10th ranked point guard in the 2021 recruiting class. On April 24, 2020, Harmon committed to The University of Texas.

College career
As a freshman, Harmon quickly emerged as the starting point guard for the Longhorns. Harmon's 30 point career high against Iowa State played a major role in securing the first Big 12 Championship for the Longhorns since 2003. Harmon earned many accolades her freshman season. These accolades include 4-time Big 12 Freshman of the Week, All-Big 12 Second Team, Big 12 All-Defensive Team, Big 12 All-Freshman Team, Big 12 Freshman of the Year, and Big 12 Tournament Most Outstanding Player. Also, Harmon became the first freshman in Texas women’s basketball history to earn All-American honors as she was voted honorable mention by the Associated Press. Harmon also broke Terri Mackey’s record of most assists by a freshman in school history.

College statistics 

|-
| style="text-align:left;"| 2021–22
| style="text-align:left;"| Texas
| 36 || 34 || 30.0 || .397 || .319 || .733 || 4.4 || 5.0 || 2.4 || 0.0 || 11.4
|-
| style="text-align:left;"| 2022–23
| style="text-align:left;"| Texas
| 0 || 0 || 0 || .000 || .000 || .000 || 0.0 || 0.0 || 0.0 || 0.0 || 0.0
|-
|- class="sortbottom"
| style="text-align:center;" colspan="2"| Career
| 36 || 34 || 30.0 || .397 || .319 || .733 || 4.4 || 5.0 || 2.4 || 0.0 || 11.4

Source:

References

Living people
American women's basketball players
Basketball players from Texas
McDonald's High School All-Americans
People from Houston
Point guards
Sportspeople from the Houston metropolitan area
Texas Longhorns women's basketball players
Year of birth missing (living people)